Richard Carl Wesley (born August 1, 1949) is a senior United States circuit judge of the United States Court of Appeals for the Second Circuit.

Education and background 
He was born on August 1, 1949 in Canandaigua, Ontario County, New York. Wesley attended the State University of New York at Albany followed by Cornell Law School, receiving a Bachelor of Arts degree in 1971 and Juris Doctor in 1974, respectively. He began his career as a lawyer in private practice in Pittsford and Geneseo, New York between 1976 and 1987. He entered politics as a Republican, and was assistant counsel to the minority party in the New York State Assembly from 1979 to 1982. He was a  member of the Assembly from 1983 to 1986, sitting in the 185th and 186th New York State Legislatures.

State judicial service
Wesley's judicial career began with his election to the New York State Supreme Court in 1986. He served as a trial judge on the Supreme Court from 1987 to 1994, when he was appointed to the Appellate Division. He was an associate justice of New York Supreme Court, Appellate Division, Fourth Judicial Department from 1994 to 1996. In 1997, Governor George Pataki selected Wesley as his first appointee to serve as an Associate Judge of the New York Court of Appeals, New York's highest court, which he did until 2003.

Federal judicial service
On March 5, 2003, President George W. Bush nominated Wesley to the Second Circuit in order to fill the seat vacated by Judge Pierre N. Leval,  who assumed senior status. The United States Senate confirmed Wesley's nomination just over three months later on June 11, 2003 by a 96–0 vote. He received his commission on June 12, 2003. He assumed senior status on August 1, 2016.

References

External links 

1949 births
21st-century American judges
Cornell Law School alumni
Judges of the United States Court of Appeals for the Second Circuit
Living people
Judges of the New York Court of Appeals
New York (state) Republicans
Politicians from Canandaigua, New York
United States court of appeals judges appointed by George W. Bush
University at Albany, SUNY alumni